The West End Festival is an annual festival in the West End of Glasgow, Scotland.

History
The West End Festival in Glasgow was started in 1996 by Michael Dale as a small local festival centred on Byres Road.

It has since become the biggest festival in Glasgow's calendar  with events running for 16 days in June. It has been used as a model for other festival start-ups, as with minimal local authority or Scottish Arts Council funding, and has grown with each festival. Its centrepiece carnival parade is the largest carnival event in the UK after Notting Hill in London. In 2006 the parade day ran congruently with the Glasgow Mela; organisers billed it as "Scotland's Mardi Gras" and an estimated 100,000 people took to the streets and parks..

Main Events
During the festival a wide range of activities and events take place. Prominent is a programme of live music, outdoor theatre, comedy, drama, guided walks, talks, film, children's events, various local street celebrations and markets, and a well-known Carnival Parade and Street Party on the opening Sunday. It has also hosted a series of events such as The Longest Day (1998/99), The Ideal Hut Show (in conjunction with Glasgow's Year of Architecture) and in 2004 a free outdoor concert led by Belle & Sebastian in the Glasgow Botanic Gardens and in 2006 an outdoor production with a cast of sixty actors based on the life of Jesus. In 2008 the Globe Theatre from London performed "Romeo and Juliet" in the hallowed quarters of the University of Glasgow quadrangle, underneath the iconic George Gilbert Scott tower.   Regular features include the Bard in the Botanics (founded 1999), a Children's Author series featuring authors such as Julia Donaldson, and the Gibson Street Gala, started in 2004. In 2010 this attracted over 15,000 people. An innovation for 2010 was a West End Highland Games at Hughenden Sport Fields.

Awards
The festival was placed in the top 30 festivals in Europe by The Independent newspaper. Two other Scottish festivals listed were listed, the Edinburgh Festival and T in the Park. The free 2004 Belle and Sebastian concert was voted in the top 20 gigs of all time by the Scotsman newspaper in 2007. The festival was voted number one in the top five reasons to visit Glasgow by Trip Advisor in 2007.

Main Venues

Anniesland College
Ashton Lane
Captain's Rest
Charles Rennie Mackintosh Church
Coach House Trust
College of Piping
Cottier Theatre
Gilmorehill G12
Glasgow Botanic Gardens
Glasgow Museum of Transport
Hidden Lane
Hillhead Baptist Church
Hillhead Library
Hunterian Museum
Hyndland Parish Church
Kelvin Stevenson Church
Kelvinside Academy
Kelvinside Allotments
Kelvinside Hillhead Church
Kelvingrove Art Gallery
Kelvingrove Park
Kibble Palace
La Bodega / Dance With Attitude
Lansdowne Church
Mansfield Park
Mitchell Library
Òran Mór
Partick Burgh Halls
Partick Library
St Bride's Church
St Mary's Cathedral
St. Luke's Orthodox Cathedral
St Peter's Church, Partick
Stand Comedy Club
Steiner School
Tchaiovna Tea Rooms
The Tall Ship at Glasgow Harbour
University of Glasgow
Wellington Church
West of Scotland Cricket Ground

See also

Culture in Glasgow
Glasgow Festivals

External links

Official site
Photographs taken during the 2004/5/6 West End Festival Parades in Glasgow
Photographs taken during the 2007 West End Festival Street Parade in Glasgow
Byres Road : A Short Guide
Glasgow West End : A Community Guide to Glasgow West End

Tourist attractions in Glasgow
Festivals in Glasgow
Hillhead
Partick